The 2014 Women's EuroHockey Club Trophy was the 38th edition of the women's Women's EuroHockey Club Trophy, Europe's secondary club field hockey tournament organized by the EHF. It was held from 6 to 9 June 2014 in Loughborough, England.

Leicester won the tournament after defeating Izmaylovo 2–1 in the final. Loreto finished third, after defeating Complutense 3–2 in penalties after a 1–1 draw.

Teams

 Victorya Smolevichi
 Royal Antwerp 
 Leicester
 Loreto
 Izmaylovo
 Metrostroy
 Complutense
 Sumchanka

Results

Preliminary round

Pool A

Pool B

Classification round

Seventh and eighth place

Fifth and sixth place

Third and fourth place

Final

Statistics

Final standings

  Leicester
  Izmaylovo
  Loreto
  Complutense
  Metrostroy
  Sumchanka
  Royal Antwerp 
  Victorya Smolevichi

References

Club Trophy Women
EuroHockey Club Trophy
International women's field hockey competitions hosted by England
Women's EuroHockey Club Trophy
EuroHockey Club Trophy
EuroHockey Club Trophy
Sport in Loughborough